The Inline hockey at the World Games 2009 competition took place between 23 and 26 July in Taiwan. The games were played in the I-Shou University gymnasium in Kaohsiung. The United States won the competition going undefeated with a 5–0–0 record.

Rosters
Each team's roster for the World Games 2009 consists of at least eight skaters (forwards, and defencemen) and 2 goaltenders, and at most 16 skaters and three goaltenders.

Preliminary round
Six participating teams played every team in a round-robin. Medals were given to teams based on total points accumulated.

All games are played at the I-Shou University Gymnasium in Kaohsiung.

References

 

2009 World Games
2009 in inline hockey